Alucita longipalpella is a moth of the family Alucitidae. It is found in China (the Yangtze Valley).

References

Moths described in 1939
Alucitidae
Moths of Asia